Jeff Lawrence (born November 14, 1957) is an entrepreneur, technologist and philanthropist.

Early life
Jeff was born in  Cleveland, Ohio. His father was Ray Lawrence and his mother was Grace Lawrence. He has two younger sisters, Connie and Lisa. Jeff was married to Diane Troth, who died on November 30, 2016, and they have two children, Christopher and Kathy. He lived briefly in Northridge, California and New York, New York, and grew up in  Van Nuys, California and  Studio City, California. He was very interested in science and technology as a child. While going to college Jeff worked at Butterfly Media Dimensions, a company founded by Allen Secher, a rabbi, civil rights activist, radio personality, and television producer. Jeff received a bachelor's degree in electrical engineering from the University of California, Los Angeles, in 1979.

Business
After graduating from UCLA Jeff joined Amdahl Corporation's Communications Systems Division in 1980. Amdahl had just finished acquiring the privately held company Tran Telecommunications which became its Communications Systems Division. At Amdahl, Jeff developed software for high performance  packet switching systems designed for large enterprise and public data network infrastructures. Amdahl's circuit and packet switching systems were sold to PTT's and enterprises around the world. Some customers for the circuit and packet switching systems included Pacific Bell, SAPO, the Trans-Canada Telephone System and AT&T. The systems were used to build the Pacific Bell, Datapac and SAPONET public data networks as well as portions of AT&T's enterprise network. Jeff left Amdahl just before it moved its Communications Systems Division from  Marina Del Rey, California to Richardson, Texas and went to Doelz Networks in 1985.

At Doelz, Jeff developed software and systems for high availability local area network and wide area network products for large enterprise network infrastructures. After the 1987 stock market crash, Doelz Networks experienced financial difficulties and Jeff was laid off in 1988. Doelz Networks was bought by its management and a group of European investors in 1988.

Jeff co-founded, with Larisa Chistyakov, Trillium Digital Systems in 1988 and served as its President & CEO until its acquisition by Intel Corporation in 2000. Jeff continued at Intel as the Chief Technology Officer for its Communications Group and left Intel in 2002. Trillium Digital Systems developed and licensed communications software to communications equipment manufacturers building the wireless, Internet, broadband and telephone infrastructure. Trillium software has been developed, licensed and used to build telecommunications equipment for over 30 years.

Jeff and his wife, Diane Troth, founded The Lawrence Foundation in 2000 after Trillium's acquisition by Intel. The Lawrence Foundation is a family foundation that makes grants to non-profit environmental, human services, and other causes. The Lawrence Foundation has made over $5.5 million in grants since its inception.

Jeff co-founded, with Lori Mitchell, the Common Grant Application in 2006 and continues to serve as its President. The Common Grant Application offers a Web-based service that serves as a common application to non-profit grantseekers and a grant management system to non-profit grantmakers.

Jeff sits on the  UCLA Samueli School of Engineering Dean's Executive Board.

Jeff served on the board of directors of Guidance Software (NASDAQ:GUID), a provider of computer forensic, eDiscovery and cybersecurity between 2008 and 2015. Guidance Software was acquired by OpenText (NASDAQ: OTEX) in September 2017.

Achievements
 1997, 1998 - Trillium listed in Inc. 500 for its fast growth as a private company 
 1997 – Co-recipient of the Greater Los Angeles Area Entrepreneur of the Year award 
 2005 – Recipient of the UCLA School of Engineering’s Professional Achievement award

Articles written
"The Network Tapestry". Communications Systems Design, February 1998.
"Today’s Networks". Global Communications, 1998.
"The Network Frontier: Wireless Technology and the Imagination". CTI Magazine, June 1999.
"Battle of the Infrastructures: Voice-over-IP and Voice-over-ATM". OEM Integrator.
"The Role of Protocols in the Network Infrastructure". Telecom International.
"Internet Telephony and the Three I's". CTI Magazine, January 1999.
"Building the Future Network". Annual Review of Communications.
"Integrating SS7 and IP Technologies". CTI Magazine, April 1999.
"IMHO: On the Road to Voice-over-IP". Business Communications Review.
"Distributed Network Intelligence and VoIP". TMCnet.com, August 1999.
"Make it Run Forever". CTI Magazine, August 1999.
"Separation Anxiety". European Communications.
"Going With the Flow, MPLS and Quality of Service in the Next-Generation Networks". CTI Magazine, October 1999.
"The Emergence of a Unified Signalling Architecture". IEC Annual Review of Communications, 2000.
"In Search of the Killer Apps". Communications Solutions, February 2000.
"Battle of the Infrastructures". Communications Solutions, May 2000.
"Information Security in an Open Public Network". Communications Solutions, July 2000.
"MPLS: Quality of Service and the Next Generation Network". Integrated Communications Design, July 2000.
"The Next Generation Network". Global Communications, 2001.
"Content Distribution: The Next Frontier". Communications Solutions, February 2001.
"Bus, Bus, Interconnect". Communications Solutions, June 2001.
"Processing Models for the NGN". Communications Solutions, August 2001.
"How Do You Measure Performance?". Communications Solutions, November 2001.

Selected articles, publications and presentations
"Processing Models for the Next Generation Network" FPL '01 Proceedings of the 11th International Conference on Field-Programmable Logic and Applications, August 28, 2001
"Nanotechnology: Science, Innovation, and Opportunity" - Chapter 10. Edited by Lynn Foster. Prentice Hall, 2006.
"Why be an Entrepreneur? What It Takes to Succeed". Keynote. Caltech/MIT Enterprise Forum, October 2003.
"From Techie to Tycoon: You don't need an MBA to develop leading edge technology for the marketplace". Panelist. Caltech/MIT Enterprise Forum, October 2004.
"Successful Entrepreneurial Leaders: From Scrappy Founders to Polished Professional Managers". Panelist. Caltech/MIT Enterprise Forum, October 2009. (Video)
"The Game of Philanthropy" Western Regional Planned Giving Conference, June 2, 2005.

Further reading
"Roadmap to Entrepreneurial Success". Robert W. Price, AMACOM, 2004.
"How You Can Become Ma Bell". Karen Kaplan. Los Angeles Times, March 25, 1996.
"Growing Lean". Douglas Young. Los Angeles Business Journal, December 2, 1996.
"Network Broker". Communications News. October 1998.
"UCLA Entrepreneurs’ Accomplishments Honored". UCLA SEAS Insider. Spring 1998.
"Preparation Counts More Than Luck". Juan Hovey. Los Angeles Times, October 6, 1999.
"It's a Do-It-Yourself Era for Budding Benefactors". Scott Martelle. The Los Angeles Times, April 8, 2002.

References

External links
 Common Grant Application
 The Lawrence Foundation
 Clivia Systems
 Guidance Software

1957 births
American businesspeople
American philanthropists
Living people
People from Van Nuys, Los Angeles
People from Studio City, Los Angeles